The 2017 Belgian Grand Prix (formally known as the 2017 Formula 1 Pirelli Belgian Grand Prix) was a Formula One motor race that was held on 27 August 2017 at the Circuit de Spa-Francorchamps in Stavelot, Belgium. The race, scheduled to be contested over forty-four laps, was the twelfth round of the 2017 FIA Formula One World Championship, and marked the seventy-third running of the Belgian Grand Prix and the sixtieth time the race was held at Spa-Francorchamps.

Ferrari driver Sebastian Vettel entered the round with a fourteen-point lead over Lewis Hamilton in the World Drivers' Championship with Valtteri Bottas a further nineteen points behind in third. In the World Constructors' Championship, Mercedes led Ferrari by thirty-nine points before the race.

In his 200th Grand Prix, Hamilton started the race from pole position for the 68th time in his career, equaling the record of Michael Schumacher for most poles, and went on to win the race. In doing so, he closed to within seven points of Vettel's championship lead.

Television and motorsport personality Guy Martin was present as part of the Williams pit team as part of filming for an episode of his 'Speed' series.

Qualifying

Notes
 – Jolyon Palmer, Marcus Ericsson and Pascal Wehrlein each received a five-place grid penalty for unscheduled gearbox changes.
 – Stoffel Vandoorne received a series of grid penalties totalling sixty-five places for exceeding his quota of power unit elements and an unscheduled gearbox change.
 – Felipe Massa received a five-place grid penalty for ignoring yellow flags in Free Practice 3.
 – Daniil Kvyat received a twenty-place grid penalty for exceeding his quota of power unit elements.

Race
At the start Lewis Hamilton held off Sebastian Vettel to lead although Vettel would continue to pressure him for most of the race. In the second half of the race, the safety car came out after the two Force India cars of Esteban Ocon and Sergio Pérez collided leaving debris on the track, earlier in the race both Pérez and Ocon had also touched wheels. Hamilton was not happy with the deployment of the safety car labelling it "BS", on the restart he came under attack again from Vettel but was able to fend him off up until the finish. Daniel Ricciardo came home in 3rd place, Valtteri Bottas' chances of the title were fading after only managing 5th.

Race classification 

Notes
 – Sergio Pérez retired from the race, but was classified as he had completed 90% of the race distance.

Championship standings after the race

Drivers' Championship standings

Constructors' Championship standings

 Note: Only the top five positions are included for both sets of standings.

Notes

See also
 2017 Spa-Francorchamps Formula 2 round
 2017 Spa-Francorchamps GP3 Series round

References

2017 Formula One races
Grand Prix
2017
August 2017 sports events in Europe